Qaleh Kharabeh may refer to:
 Qaleh Kharabeh, Fars
 Qaleh Kharabeh, Gorgan
 Qaleh Kharabeh, Semnan